Reo is an unincorporated community in Ohio Township, Spencer County, in the U.S. state of Indiana.

The name Reo was coined in 1966 as an acronym of three nearby larger cities: Rockport, Indiana, Evansville, Indiana, and Owensboro, Kentucky.

Education
South Spencer High School and South Spencer Middle School are located in Reo.

Geography

The community is concentrated around the intersection of State Road 66 and State Road 161, a few miles northwest of the Ohio River.

References

External links

Unincorporated communities in Spencer County, Indiana
Unincorporated communities in Indiana